The 1971 Sonoma State Cossacks football team represented Sonoma State College—now known as Sonoma State University—as a member of the Far Western Conference (FWC) during the 1971 NCAA College Division football season. Led by Carl Peterson in his second and final season as head coach, Sonoma State compiled an overall record of 2–8 with a mark of 0–6 in conference play, placing last out of sevens teams in the FWC. The team was outscored by their opponents 277 to 153 for the season. The played Cossacks played home games at Cossacks Stadium in Rohnert Park, California. 

Peterson finished his stint as Sonoma State with an overall record of 6–12–1, for a .342 winning percentage. In April 1972, Sonoma State announced it no longer field a football team due to financial issues. They did not have another team until a club team was started in 1979.

Schedule

Notes

References

Sonoma State
Sonoma State Cossacks football seasons
Sonoma State Cossacks football